This is an alphabetical list of the fungal taxa as recorded from South Africa. Currently accepted names have been appended.

Ca
Genus: Caeoma Link 1809, accepted as Puccinia Pers., (1794) (Rusts)
Caeoma clematidis Thüm. 1876
Caeoma heteromorphae Doidge 1927
Caeoma lichtensteiniae Doidge 1941,
Caeoma nervisequum Thüm. 1877 accepted as Milesina nervisequa (Thüm.) P. Syd. & Syd., (1915)
Caeoma (Aecidium) resinaecola Rud. accepted as Caeoma resinicola F. Rudolphi, (1829)
Caeoma ricini Schltdl. 1826

Family: Caliciaceae Chevall. 1826

Genus: Calicium Pers. 1794 (Lichens)
Calicium turbinatum Pers. 1797 accepted as Sphinctrina turbinata Fr., (1825)

Genus: Callopisma De Not. 1847 accepted as Caloplaca Th. Fr., (1860)
Callopisma capense A. Massal. 1861 as capensis
Callopisma cinnabarinum (Ach.) Müll. Arg. 1881 accepted as Brownliella cinnabarina (Ach.) S.Y. Kondr., Kärnefelt, A. Thell, Elix, Jung Kim, A.S. Kondr. & Hur, (2013)
Callopisma cinnabarinum var. opacum Müll. Arg. 1881 accepted as Brownliella cinnabarina (Ach.) S.Y. Kondr., Kärnefelt, A. Thell, Elix, Jung Kim, A.S. Kondr. & Hur, (2013)
Callopisma crocodes A. Massal. 1861
Callopisma flavum Müll. Arg. 1893
Callopisma haematodes A. Massal. 1861;
Callopisma teicophilum A. Massal. 1861
Callopisma zambesicum Müll. Arg. 1893

Genus: Calloriopsis Syd. & P. Syd. 1917
Calloriopsis gelatinosa  (Sacc.) Syd. & P. Syd. 1917, accepted as Calloriopsis herpotricha (Berk.) R. Sant., (1951)

Genus: Calocera (Fr.) Fr. 1828
Calocera cornea (Batsch) Fr. 1827

Genus: Calonectria De Not. 1867
Calonectria capensis Doidge 1924, accepted as Byssocallis capensis (Doidge) Rossman, (1979)
Calonectria cephalosporii Hansf. 1946, accepted as Dimerosporiella cephalosporii (Hansf.) Rossman & Samuels, in Rossman, Samuels, Rogerson & Lowen, (1999)
Calonectria decora (Wallr.) Sacc. 1878, accepted as Flammocladiella decora (Wallr.) Lechat & J. Fourn., (2018)
Calonectria leucorrhodina (Mont.) Speg. 1881 accepted as Dimerosporiella leucorrhodina (Mont.) Rossman & Samuels, (1999)
Calonectria meliolae Hansf. 1941
Calonectria rigidiuscula (Berk. & Broome) Sacc., (1878), accepted as  Albonectria rigidiuscula (Berk. & Broome) Rossman & Samuels (1999)
Calonectria ugandae Hansf. 1941

Genus: Calopeltis Syd. 1925, accepted as Cyclotheca Theiss., (1914)
Calopeltis jasmini Doidge 1942, accepted as Cyclotheca jasmini (Doidge) Arx, (1962)

Genus: Caloplaca Th. Fr. 1860, (Lichens)
Caloplaca amphidoxa (Stizenb.) Zahlbr. 1930
Caloplaca aurantiaca (Lightf.) Th. Fr. 1861, accepted as Blastenia ferruginea (Huds.) A. Massal.,(1852)
Caloplaca aurantiaca f. fulva Zahlbr.
Caloplaca benguellensis (Nyl.) Zahlbr. 1930
Caloplaca calviniana Zahlbr. 1932
Caloplaca capensis (A. Massal.) Zahlbr. 1930
Caloplaca cardinalis Zahlbr. 1932
Caloplaca carphinea var. scoriophila (A. Massal.) J. Steiner 1911 accepted as Usnochroma scoriophilum (A. Massal.) Søchting, Arup & Frödén, (2013)
Caloplaca cataschista Zahlbr. 1936 [as catachista]
Caloplaca cerina (Hedw.) Th. Fr. 1861
Caloplaca cinnabarina (Ach.) Zahlbr. 1908, accepted as Brownliella cinnabarina (Ach.) S.Y. Kondr., Kärnefelt, A. Thell, Elix, Jung Kim, A.S. Kondr. & Hur, (2013)
Caloplaca cinnabarina var. opaca (Müll. Arg.) Zahlbr. 1930, accepted as Brownliella cinnabarina (Ach.) S.Y. Kondr., Kärnefelt, A. Thell, Elix, Jung Kim, A.S. Kondr. & Hur, (2013)
Caloplaca cinnabarina var. pallidior (Stizenb.) Jatta 1910
Caloplaca cinnabarina var. subfulgescens (Nyl.) Zahlbr. 1930
Caloplaca cinnabariza (Nyl.) Zahlbr. 1930
Caloplaca coccinella (Stizenb.) Zahlbr. 1930
Caloplaca conchiliata Zahlbr. 1932
Caloplaca crocodes (A. Massal.) Zahlbr. 1930
Caloplaca delectans Zahlbr. 1932
Caloplaca diploplaca Zahlbr. 1932
Caloplaca diploplaca var. gracilior Zahlbr. 1932
Caloplaca discolorella Zahlbr. 1932
Caloplaca ecklonii (A. Massal.) Zahlbr. 1931
Caloplaca effusa G. Merr. ex Van der Byl 1931
Caloplaca elegans (Link) Th.Fr. (1871), accepted as Xanthoria elegans (Link) Th.Fr. (1860)
Caloplaca elegantissima (Nyl.) Zahlbr. 1931 accepted as Stellarangia elegantissima (Nyl.) Frödén, Arup & Søchting, (2013)
Caloplaca eudoxa (Müll. Arg.) Zahlbr. 1931 accepted as Teloschistopsis eudoxa (Müll. Arg.) Frödén, Arup & Søchting, (2013)
Caloplaca euelpis (Stizenb.) Zahlbr. 1930
Caloplaca fecunda Zahlbr. 1932
Caloplaca ferruginea (Huds.) Th. Fr. 1861, accepted as Blastenia ferruginea (Huds.) A. Massal., (1852)
Caloplaca ferruginea f. erysibe Jatta 1900
Caloplaca ferrugineovirens (Vain.) Zahlbr. 1932
Caloplaca flava (Müll. Arg.) Zahlbr. 1930
Caloplaca flavorubens (Nyl.) Zahlbr. 1931;
Caloplaca flavovirescens (Wulfen) Dalla Torre & Sarnth. 1902, accepted as Gyalolechia flavovirescens (Wulfen) Søchting, Frödén & Arup, (2013)
Caloplaca gracilescens Zahlbr. 1932
Caloplaca granulosa Jatta. (sic) possibly (Müll. Arg.) J. Steiner 1894, accepted as Flavoplaca granulosa (Müll. Arg.) Arup, Frödén & Søchting, (2013)
Caloplaca haematodes (A. Massal.) Zahlbr. 1930
Caloplaca hampeana (A. Massal.) Zahlbr. 1930
Caloplaca lamprocheila Flagey.
Caloplaca leptopisma (Nyl.) Zahlbr. 1931
Caloplaca leucoxantha (Müll. Arg.) Zahlbr. 1931
Caloplaca massula (Stizenb.) Zahlbr. 1930
Caloplaca mastophora (Vain.) Zahlbr. 1932
Caloplaca mastophora var. flavorubescens Vain
Caloplaca murorum Th. Fr. 1871, accepted as Calogaya saxicola (Hoffm.) Vondrák,(2016)
Caloplaca neethlingii Zahlbr. 1936
Caloplaca nideri var. pruinosula Zahlbr. 1926
Caloplaca nolens Zahlbr. 1932
Caloplaca odoardii (Bagl.) Zahlbr. 1930
Caloplaca orichalcea (Stizenb.) Zahlbr. 1931
Caloplaca pallidior (Müll. Arg.) Zahlbr. 1931
Caloplaca pallidior f. opaca (Müll. Arg.) Zahlbr. 1932 accepted as Brownliella cinnabarina (Ach.) S.Y. Kondr., Kärnefelt, A. Thell, Elix, Jung Kim, A.S. Kondr. & Hur, (2013)
Caloplaca perexigua Zahlbr. 1932
Caloplaca phlogina  (Ach.) Flagey 1886, accepted as Scythioria phlogina (Ach.) S.Y. Kondr., Kärnefelt, Elix, A. Thell & Hur, (2014)
Caloplaca placidia (A. Massal.) J. Steiner 1916
Caloplaca platyna Zahlbr. 1936
Caloplaca poliotera (Nyl.) J. Steiner 1897
Caloplaca punicea (Müll. Arg.) Jatta 1910
Caloplaca pyracea Th.Fr. (sic), possibly (Ach.) Zwackh 1862, accepted as Athallia pyracea (Ach.) Arup, Frödén & Søchting, (2013)
Caloplaca pyracea f. pyrithromoides (Nyl.) H. Olivier 1909
Caloplaca pyracea f. subpicta Zahlbr. 1931
Caloplaca pyracea var. pyrithroma (Ach.) Flagey 1888, accepted as Athallia pyracea (Ach.) Arup, Frödén & Søchting, (2013)
Caloplaca pyropoecila (Nyl.) Zahlbr. 1931
Caloplaca pyropoeciloides Zahlbr. 1932
Caloplaca regalis (Vain.) Zahlbr. 1931 accepted as Polycauliona regalis (Vain.) Hue, (1908)
Caloplaca regalis f. prostrata (Hue) Zahlbr. 1931 accepted as Polycauliona prostrata (Hue) C.W. Dodge, (1973)
Caloplaca sophodes (Vain.) Zahlbr. 1932
Caloplaca subcerina (Nyl.) Zahlbr. 1924
Caloplaca subseptata Zahlbr. 1932
Caloplaca subsoluta (Nyl.) Zahlbr. 1931 accepted as Squamulea subsoluta (Nyl.) Arup, Søchting & Frödén, (2013)
Caloplaca subpunicolor Zahlbr.*
Caloplaca sympageella (Vain.) Zahlbr. 1932
Caloplaca tegularis (Ehrh.) Sandst. 1912
Caloplaca teicophila (A. Massal.) Zahlbr. 1931
Caloplaca theloschistoides Zahlbr. 1921 accepted as Polycauliona theloschistoides (Zahlbr.) C.W. Dodge, (1971)
Caloplaca zambesica (Müll. Arg.) Zahlbr. 1931

Family: Caloplacaceae Zahlbr. 1908

Genus: Calosphaeria Tul. & C. Tul. 1863
Calosphaeria cylindrica (Kalchbr. & Cooke) Sacc. 1882, accepted as Peroneutypa cylindrica (Kalchbr. & Cooke.) Berl., (1902)
Calosphaeria princeps Tul. & C. Tul. 1863,

Genus: Calospora 
Calospora arausiaca (Fabre) Sacc. 1883, accepted as Coryneum arausiacum (Fabre) Senan., Maharachch. & K.D. Hyde [as 'arausiaca'], (2017)
Calospora bottomleyae Doidge 1941,

Genus: Calothyrium Theiss. 1912, accepted as Asterinella Theiss., (1912)
Calothyrium psychotriae Doidge 1922, accepted as Schiffnerula psychotriae (Doidge) S. Hughes, (1987)

Genus: Calvatia Fr. 1849
Calvatia caelata (Bull.) Morgan (1890), accepted as Bovistella utriformis (Bull.) Demoulin & Rebriev, (2017)
Calvatia candida (Rostk.) Hollós 1902
Calvatia fontanesii Lloyd*
Calvatia gigantea (Batsch) Lloyd 1904
Calvatia incerta Bottomley 1948
Calvatia lepidophora Lloyd (sic) possibly (Ellis & Everh.) Coker & Couch 1928;
Calvatia lilacina (Mont. & Berk.) Henn. 1904
Calvatia macrogemmae Lloyd 1923
Calvatia olivacea (Cooke & Massee) Lloyd 1905
Calvatia pachyderma (Peck) Morgan 1890, accepted as Langermannia pachyderma (Peck) Kreisel, (1962)
Calvatia saccata (Vahl) Morgan 1890, accepted as Lycoperdon excipuliforme (Scop.) Pers., (1801)

Genus: Campanella Henn. 1895,
Campanella buettneri Henn. [as büttneri], (1895)
Campanella cucullata (Fr.) Lloyd 1919, accepted as Campanella junghuhnii (Mont.) Singer, (1945)

Genus: Campbellia Cooke & Massee 1890, accepted as Gyrodon Opat., (1836)
Campbellia africana Cooke & Massee 1890, accepted as Gyrodon africanus (Cooke & Massee) Singer, (1951)

Genus: Candelaria A. Massal. 1852 (Lichens)
Candelaria concolor (Dicks.) Arnold 1879
Candelaria fibrosa (Fr.) Müll. Arg. 1887
Candelaria stellata (Tuck.) Müll. Arg. 1887, accepted as Coccocarpia stellata Tuck., (1862)

Genus: Candelariella Müll. Arg. 1894(Lichens)
Candelariella elaeophaea (Nyl.) Zahlbr. 1928
Candelariella glaucolivescens (Nyl.) Zahlbr. 1928
Candelariella vitellina (Hoffm.) Müll. Arg. 1894
Candelariella vitellina f. athallina (Wedd.) Zahlbr. 1928

Genus: Candida Berkhout 1923(Yeasts)
Candida albicans (C.P. Robin) Berkhout, (1923) recorded as Candida bethaliensis (Pijper) C.W. Dodge, 1935 and Candida triadis (Langeron & Talice) Langeron & Guerra 1938,
Candida bethaliensis (Pijper) C.W. Dodge 1935 accepted as Candida albicans (C.P. Robin) Berkhout, (1923)
Candida krusei Basgal.(sic) possibly (Castell.) Berkhout 1923, accepted as Issatchenkia orientalis Kudryavtsev, (1960)
Candida triadis (Langeron & Talice) Langeron & Guerra 1938, accepted as Candida albicans (C.P. Robin) Berkhout, (1923)

Genus: Cantharellus Adans. ex Fr. 1821
Cantharellus capensis Berk. 1844, accepted as Campanella capensis (Berk.) D.A. Reid, (1975)
Cantharellus cinnabarinus (Schwein.) Schwein. 1832
Cantharellus foliolum Kalchbr. 1881
Cantharellus leucophaeus (Pers.) Nouel 1831, accepted as Faerberia carbonaria (Alb. & Schwein.) Pouzar, (1981)

Family: Capnodiaceae Höhn. ex Theiss. 1916

Genus: Capnodium Mont. 1849,
Capnodium australe Mont. 1849
Capnodium citricola McAlpine [as citricolum], (1896)
Capnodium citri Berk. & Desm., in Berkeley, (1849)
Capnodium fuligo Berk. & Desm. 1849, accepted as Microxyphiella fuligo (Berk. & Desm.) Speg., (1918)
Capnodium salicinum Mont. 1849, accepted as Capnodium citri Berk. & Desm., (1849)

Genus: Castellania  C.W. Dodge 1935, accepted as Candida Berkhout, (1923)
Castellania balcanica (Castell. & Chalm.) C.W. Dodge 1935, accepted as Issatchenkia orientalis Kudryavtsev, (1960)
Castellania linguae-pilosae (Lucet) C.W. Dodge 1935, accepted as Candida tropicalis (Castell.) Berkhout, (1923)
Castellania pseudolondinensis (Castell. & Chalm.) C.W. Dodge 1935, accepted as Candida albicans (C.P. Robin) Berkhout, (1923)
Castellania pseudotropicalis (Castell.) C.W. Dodge 1935, accepted as Kluyveromyces marxianus (E.C. Hansen) Van der Walt, (1971)
Castellania sp.

Genus: Catacauma Theiss. & Syd. 1914,accepted as Phyllachora Nitschke ex Fuckel, (1870)
Catacauma goyazense (Henn.) Theiss. & Syd. 1915,  accepted as Phyllachora goyazensis Henn., (1895)
Catacauma grammicum (Henn.) Theiss. & Syd. 1915,  accepted as Phyllachora grammica Henn., (1907)
Catacauma peglerae Doidge 1921, accepted as Phyllachora peglerae (Doidge) Doidge, (1942)
Catacauma pterocarpi (Syd. & P. Syd.) Syd. 1915, accepted as Phyllachora pterocarpi Syd. & P. Syd.,  (1912)
Catacauma punctum (Cooke) Theiss. & Syd. 1917 [as puncta] accepted as Phyllachora puncta (Cooke) Cooke, (1885)
Catacauma schotiae  Doidge 1922, [as schotii], accepted as Phyllachora schotiae (Doidge) Doidge,  (1942)

Genus: Catalechia *
Catalechia africana Müll.Arg.*

Genus: Catastoma Morgan 1892, accepted as  Disciseda Czern. (1845)
Catastoma anomalum (Cooke & Massee) Lloyd 1905,  accepted as Disciseda anomala (Cooke & Massee) G. Cunn., (1927)
Catastoma castaneum Lloyd*
Catastoma circumscissum Morgan (sic) possibly Berk. & M.A. Curtis 1892
Catastoma duthiei Lloyd*
Catastoma juglandiforme Lloyd (sic), [as juglandiformis], possibly (Berk. ex Massee) Lohwag 1930, accepted as Disciseda juglandiformis (Berk. ex Massee) Hollós, (1902)
Catastoma magnum Lloyd*
Catastoma pedicellatum Morgan 1892, accepted as Disciseda pedicellata (Morgan) Hollós, (1902)
Catastoma zeyheri Lloyd*

Genus: Catillaria A. Massal. 1852(Lichens)
Catillaria chalybeia (Borrer) A. Massal. 1852
Catillaria finckei Zahlbr. 1921
Catillaria intermixta (Nyl.) Arnold 1870, accepted as Megalaria intermixta (Nyl.) Kalb, (2007)
Catillaria intermixta f. cyanocentra Zahlbr.
Catillaria lenticularis (Ach.) Th. Fr. 1874,
Catillaria lenticularis f. chloropoliza (Nyl.) Boistel 1903, accepted as Catillaria chalybeia (Borrer) A. Massal., (1852)
Catillaria lutea*
Catillaria melampepla (Tuck.) Zahlbr. 1926
Catillaria mortualis (Stizenb.) Zahlbr. 1926
Catillaria nigroclavata Schuler. (sic), possibly (Nyl.) J. Steiner 1898
Catillaria opacata (Stizenb.) Zahlbr. 1926
Catillaria rhyparoleuca A. Massal. 1861
Catillaria stellenboschiana Vain. 1926
Catillaria stictella (Stirt.) Zahlbr. 1926
Catillaria subfuscata (Nyl.) Zahlbr. 1926

Ce
Genus: Celidium Tul. 1852, accepted as Arthonia (1806)
Celidium stictarum (De Not.) Tul. 1852, accepted as Plectocarpon lichenum (Sommerf.) D. Hawksw.,(1984)

Genus: Cenangium Fr. 1818
Cenangium pelidnum (Kalchbr. & Cooke) Sacc. 1889

Genus: Cephalosporiopsis Peyronel 1916,
Cephalosporiopsis parasitica Hansf. 1943

Genus: Cephalosporium accepted as Acremonium Link (1809)
Cephalosporium sacchari E.J. Butler & Hafiz Khan, (1913), accepted as Fusarium sacchari (E.J. Butler & Hafiz Khan) W. Gams, (1971)
Cephalosporium sp.

Genus: Cephalothecium Corda 1838, accepted as Trichothecium Link, (1809)
Cephalothecium roseum (Pers.) Corda (1838), accepted as Trichothecium roseum (Pers.) Link (1809)

Genus: Cephatelium *
Cephatelium macowanianum Syd.*

Genus: Ceratium Alb. & Schwein. 1805, accepted as Ceratiomyxa J. Schröt., (1897) (Protozoa/slime moulds)
Ceratium hydnoides (Jacq.) Alb. & Schwein. 1805
Ceratium arbuscula Berk. & Broome 1873, accepted as Ceratiomyxa fruticulosa T. Macbr., (1899)
Ceratium sphaeroideum Kalchbr. & Cooke (1880), accepted as Beniowskia sphaeroidea (Kalchbr. & Cooke) E.W. Mason, (1928)

Genus: Ceratosphaeria Niessl 1876
Ceratosphaeria crinigera (Cooke) Sacc. 1883, accepted as Lentomitella crinigera (Cooke) Réblová, (2006)

Genus: Ceratostoma 
Ceratostoma cylindrica Kalchbr. & Cooke 1880, accepted as Peroneutypa cylindrica (Kalchbr. & Cooke.) Berl., (1902)

Genus: Ceratostomella Sacc. 1878,
Ceratostomella paradoxa Dade 1928, accepted as Ceratocystis paradoxa (Dade) C. Moreau, (1952)
Ceratostomella pilifera (Fr.) G. Winter 1885, accepted as Ceratocystis pilifera (Fr.) C. Moreau, (1952)

Genus: Cercoseptoria Petr. 1925, accepted as Pseudocercospora Speg., (1910)
Cercoseptoria egenula Syd. 1935, accepted as Pseudocercospora egenula (Syd.) U. Braun & Crous, (2003)

Genus: Cercospora Fresen. ex Fuckel 1863,
Cercospora apii Fresen. 1863,
Cercospora apii var. pastinacae Sacc. 1886, accepted as Passalora pastinacae (Sacc.) U. Braun, (1992)
Cercospora arachidicola Hori 1917,
Cercospora argyrolobii Chupp & Doidge 1948, accepted as Pseudocercospora argyrolobii (Chupp & Doidge) Deighton, (1976)
Cercospora bauhiniae Syd. & P. Syd. 1914, accepted as Pseudocercospora bauhiniae (Syd. & P. Syd.) Deighton, (1976)
Cercospora beticola Sacc. 1876,
Cercospora bolleana (Thüm.) Speg., (1879), accepted as Mycosphaerella bolleana B.B.Higgins, (1920)(?)
Cercospora byliana Syd. 1924, accepted as Pseudocercospora byliana (Syd.) J.M. Yen, (1980)
Cercospora caffra Syd. & P. Syd. 1914,  accepted as Stigmina knoxdaviesii Crous & U. Braun, (1996)
Cercospora canescens Ellis & G. Martin 1882
Cercospora capensis (Thüm.) Sacc. 1886, accepted as Pleurophragmium capense (Thüm.) S. Hughes,  (1958)
Cercospora carotae Solh. (sic) possibly (Pass.) Kazn. & Siemaszko 1929
Cercospora caryae Chupp & Doidge 1948
Cercospora cassinopsidis G. Winter 1885
Cercospora cichorii Davis 1919
Cercospora circumscissa Sacc. (1878), accepted as Pruniphilomyces circumscissus (Sacc.) Crous & Bulgakov, (2020)
Cercospora clerodendri I. Miyake 1913, accepted as Pseudocercospora clerodendri (I. Miyake) Deighton, (1976)
Cercospora clutiae Kalchbr. & Cooke [as cluytiae],(1880) accepted as Pseudocercospora clutiae (Kalchbr. & Cooke) Deighton [as cluytiae], (1976)
Cercospora coffeicola Berk. & Cooke 1881 
Cercospora columnaris Ellis & Everh. 1894, accepted as Pseudocercospora griseola (Sacc.) Crous & U. Braun, (2006)
Cercospora commelinae Kalchbr. & Cooke [as commelynae], (1880)
Cercospora corchori Sawada 1919
Cercospora cruenta Sacc., (1880), accepted as Mycosphaerella cruenta (Sacc.) Latham, (1934)
Cercospora curtisiae Chupp & Doidge 1948, accepted as Pseudocercospora curtisiae (Chupp & Doidge) Crous & U. Braun, (1996)
Cercospora delicatissima Kalchbr. & Cooke 1880 accepted as Passalora delicatissima (Kalchbr. & Cooke) U. Braun & Crous,(2003)
Cercospora demetrioniana G. Winter 1884 {as demetrionana]
Cercospora dissotidis Chupp & Doidge 1948, accepted as Pseudocercospora dissotidis (Chupp & Doidge) Crous & U. Braun, (1996)
Cercospora dovyalidis Chupp & Doidge 1948, accepted as Pseudocercospora dovyalidis (Chupp & Doidge) Deighton, (1976)
Cercospora egenula (Syd.) Chupp & Doidge 1948, accepted as Pseudocercospora egenula (Syd.) U. Braun & Crous, (2003)
Cercospora faureae Chupp & Doidge 1948, accepted as Podosporiella faureae (Chupp & Doidge) M.B. Ellis, (1976)
Cercospora fici Heald & F.A. Wolf 1911 accepted as Pseudocercospora fici (Heald & F.A. Wolf) X.J. Liu & Y.L. Guo, (1991)
Cercospora fukushiana  (Matsuura) W. Yamam. 1934
Cercospora fusca F.V. Rand 1914
Cercospora fusimaculans G.F. Atk. 1892, accepted as Catenulocercospora fusimaculans (G.F. Atk.) C. Nakash., Videira & Crous, (2017)
Cercospora gossypina Cooke (1883), accepted as Mycosphaerella gossypina (Cooke) Everh.
Cercospora haemanthi Kalchbr. & Cooke 1880
Cercospora grandissima Rangel 1915
Cercospora guliana Sacc. 1913 
Cercospora halleriae Chupp & Doidge 1948,  accepted as Pseudocercospora halleriae (Chupp & Doidge) Deighton, (1976)
Cercospora  Allesch. (1895) accepted as Clarohilum henningsii (Allesch.) Videira & Crous, (2017)
Cercospora heteromalla Syd. 1924, accepted as Pseudocercospora heteromalla (Syd.) Deighton, (1987)
Cercospora insulana Chupp (sic) possibly Sacc. 1915, 
Cercospora juglandis Kellerm. & Swingle 1889,  accepted as Pseudocercospora juglandis (Kellerm. & Swingle) U. Braun & Crous, (2003)
Cercospora jussiaeae G.F. Atk. 1892, [as jussieuae], accepted as Pseudocercospora jussiaeae (G.F. Atk.) Deighton, (1976)
Cercospora kiggelariae Syd. 1924, accepted as Pseudocercospora kiggelariae (Syd.) Crous & U. Braun, (1994)
Cercospora koepkei W. Krüger 1890, [as kopkei] accepted as Passalora koepkei (W. Krüger) U. Braun & Crous, (2003)
Cercospora latimaculans Wakef. 1918
Cercospora leoni Săvul. & Rayss 1935
Cercospora leonotidis Cooke 1879, accepted as Passalora leonotidis (Cooke) U. Braun & Crous, (2003)
Cercospora liebenbergii Syd. 1935,  accepted as Cercostigmina liebenbergii (Syd.) Crous & U. Braun, (1996)
Cercospora longipes E.J. Butler 1906,
Cercospora malayensis F. Stevens & Solheim 1931, as mayalensis
Cercospora melaena Syd. 1924, accepted as Pseudocercospora melaena (Syd.) Deighton, (1976)
Cercospora melanochaeta Ellis & Everh. 1894, accepted as Passalora melanochaeta (Ellis & Everh.) U. Braun, (1999)
Cercospora momordicae McRae 1929
Cercospora musae Massee 1914
Cercospora musae Zimm. 1902 accepted as Pseudocercospora musae (Zimm.) Deighton, (1976)
Cercospora myrti Erikss. 1885,
Cercospora myrticola Speg. 1886, accepted as Pseudocercospora myrticola (Speg.) Deighton, (1976)
Cercospora nicotianae Ellis & Everh. 1893,
Cercospora oblecta Syd. 1935, accepted as Pseudocercospora oblecta (Syd.) Crous & U. Braun, (2008)
Cercospora occidentalis Cooke 1878,  accepted as Passalora occidentalis (Cooke) U. Braun, (2000)
Cercospora oliniae Verwoerd & Dippen. 1930, accepted as Pseudocercospora oliniae (Verwoerd & Dippen.) Crous & U. Braun, (1996)
Cercospora omphacodes Ellis & Holw. 1885, accepted as Passalora omphacodes (Ellis & Holw.) Crous & U. Braun, (1996)
Cercospora pachycarpi Chupp & Doidge 1948, accepted as Passalora pachycarpi (Chupp & Doidge) Crous & U. Braun, (1996)
Cercospora pareirae Speg. 1910, accepted as Pseudocercospora pareirae (Speg.) Crous & U. Braun, (1996)
Cercospora pastinacae (Sacc.) Peck 1912, accepted as Passalora pastinacae (Sacc.) U. Braun, (1992)
Cercospora persicariae W. Yamam. 1934, accepted as Pseudocercospora persicariae (W. Yamam.) Deighton, (1976)
Cercospora personata (Berk. & M.A. Curtis) Ellis, (1885), accepted as Nothopassalora personata (Berk. & M.A. Curtis) U. Braun, C. Nakash., Videira & Crous, (2017)
Cercospora phaeocarpa Mitter 1937, accepted as Scolecostigmina phaeocarpa (Mitter) U. Braun, (1999)
Cercospora pouzolziae Syd. 1935,  accepted as Pseudocercospora pouzolziae (Syd.) Y.L. Guo & X.J. Liu, (1992)
Cercospora pretoriensis Chupp & Doidge 1948
Cercospora protearum Cooke 1883,  accepted as Pseudocercospora protearum (Cooke) U. Braun & Crous, (2002)
Cercospora protearum var. leucadendri Cooke 1883, accepted as Pseudocercospora leucadendri (Cooke) U. Braun & Crous, (2012)
Cercospora protearum var. leucospermi Cooke 1883
Cercospora punctiformis Sacc. & Roum. 1881
Cercospora purpurea-cincta Nel.*
Cercospora resedae Fuckel 1866,
Cercospora rhoicissi Syd. & P. Syd. 1912, accepted as Pseudocercospora rhoicissi (Syd. & P. Syd.) Deighton, (1976)
Cercospora riachueli Speg. 1880, accepted as Pseudocercospora riachueli (Speg.) Deighton, (1976)
Cercospora richardiicola G.F. Atk. [as richardiaecola], (1892)
Cercospora ricinella Sacc. & Berl. 1885,
Cercospora rubrotincta Ellis & Everh. 1887,
Cercospora scitula Syd. 1935, accepted as Pseudocercospora scitula (Syd.) Deighton, (1976)
Cercospora sesami Zimm. 1904, 
Cercospora solani-melongenae Chupp 1948,
Cercospora solani-melongenae Hori.*
Cercospora sorghi Ellis & Everh. 1887,
Cercospora sphaeroidea Speg. 1880,  accepted as Phaeoisariopsis sphaeroidea (Speg.) L.G. Br. & Morgan-Jones, (1976)
Cercospora stizolobii Syd. & P. Syd. 1913,  accepted as Pseudocercospora stizolobii (Syd. & P. Syd.) Deighton, (1976)
Cercospora transvaalensis Syd. 1935, accepted as Pseudocercospora transvaalensis (Syd.) Deighton, (1976)
Cercospora tremae (sic) Chupp. possibly Cercospora trematis (F. Stevens & Solheim) Chupp, in Chardón & Toro, (1934), accepted as Passalora trematis (F. Stevens & Solheim) U. Braun & Crous, (2003)
Cercospora vaginae W. Krüger, (1896),accepted as Passalora vaginae (W. Krüger) U. Braun & Crous, (2003)
Cercospora violae Sacc. 1876,
Cercospora viticola (Ces.) Sacc. [as viticolum], (1886), accepted as Pseudocercospora vitis (Lév.) Speg., (1910)
Cercospora vitis Sacc. (1881), accepted as Pseudocercospora vitis (Lév.) Speg., (1910)
Cercospora withaniae Syd. & P. Syd. 1912, accepted as Pseudocercospora withaniae (Syd. & P. Syd.) Deighton, (1976)
Cercospora ziziphi Petch 1909, [as zizphyi], accepted as Pseudocercospora ziziphi (Petch) Crous & U. Braun [as zizyphi], (1996)
Cercospora sp.

Genus: Cercosporella Sacc. 1880 
Cercosporella brassicae (Fautrey & Roum.) Höhn. 1924, accepted as Neopseudocercosporella capsellae (Ellis & Everh.) Videira & Crous, (2016)
Cercosporella delicatissima (Kalchbr. & Cooke) Chupp 1948, accepted as Passalora delicatissima (Kalchbr. & Cooke) U. Braun & Crous, (2003)
Cercosporella ekebergiae Syd. & P. Syd. 1914, accepted as Phaeophloeosporella ekebergiae (Syd. & P. Syd.) Crous & B. Sutton, (1997)
Cercosporella gossypii Speg. 1886, accepted as Ramularia gossypii (Speg.) Cif., (1962)
Cercosporella herpotrichoides Fron 1912, [asherpotrichioides], accepted as Oculimacula yallundae (Wallwork & Spooner) Crous & W. Gams, (2003)

Genus: Cercosporina Speg. 1910, accepted as Cercospora Fresen. ex Fuckel, (1863)
Cercosporina ricinella  (Sacc. & Berl.) Speg. 1910, accepted as Cercospora ricinella Sacc. & Berl., (1885)

Genus: Cerebella Ces. 1851, accepted as Epicoccum Link, (1816)
Cerebella cynodontis Syd. & P. Syd. 1912
Cerebella sp.

Genus: Cerotelium Arthur 1906
Cerotelium fici (Castagne) Arthur 1917
Cerotelium gossypii (Lagerh.) Arthur, (1917), accepted as Phakopsora desmium (Berk. & Broome) Cummins, (1945)

Genus: Cetraria Ach. 1803
Cetraria aculeata (Schreb.) Fr. 1826

Genus: Ceuthospora Fr. 1825, accepted as Phacidium Fr., (1815)
Ceuthospora foliicola (Lib.) Cooke 1879, accepted as Phacidium foliicola (Lib.) W.J. Li & K.D. Hyde, (2020)
Ceuthospora oleae Kalchbr. & Cooke 1880

Ch
Genus: Chaetodimerina Hansf. 1946 accepted as Rizalia Syd. & P. Syd., (1914)
Chaetodimerina schiffnerulae Hansf. 1946, accepted as Rizalia schiffnerulae (Hansf.) E. Müll., (1962)

Genus: Chaetomella Fuckel 1870
Chaetomella artemisiae Cooke 1882
Chaetomella tritici Tehon & E.Y. Daniels 1925 

Genus: Chaetominum (sic), probably Chaetomium Kunze 1817
Chaetomium chartarum Ehrenb. 1818, [as Chaetominum chartarum] accepted as Chaetomium globosum Kunze, (1817)
Chaetomium elatum Kunze 1818, as Chaetominum elatum
Chaetomium funicola Cooke 1873, as Chaetominum funicolum accepted as Dichotomopilus funicola (Cooke) X.Wei Wang & Samson, (2016)
Chaetomium globosum Kunze 1817, [as Chaetominum globosum]
Chaetomium indicum Corda 1840, [as Chaetominum indicum] accepted as Dichotomopilus indicus (Corda) X.Wei Wang & Samson, (2016)

Genus: Chaetopeltopsis Theiss. 1913, accepted as Chaetothyrina Theiss., (1913) 
Chaetopeltopsis sp.

Genus: Chaetosphaeria Tul. & C. Tul. 1863
Chaetosphaeria insectivora Hansf. 1946, accepted as Koordersiella insectivora (Hansf.) D. Hawksw. & O.E. Erikss., (1987)

Genus: Chaetostigmella Syd. & P. Syd. 1917, accepted as Dimerium (Sacc. & P. Syd.) McAlpine, (1903)
Chaetostigmella asterinicola Doidge*
Chaetostigmella capensis (Doidge) Toro 1934, accepted as Chaetothyrium capense (Doidge) Hansf., (1950)

Family: Chaetothyriaceae Hansf. ex M.E. Barr 1979

Genus: Chaetothyrium Speg. 1888
Chaetothyrium capense (Doidge) Hansf. 1950, 
Chaetothyrium syzygii Hansf. 1946,
Chaetothyrium transvaalensis v.d.Byl.*

Genus: Cheilymenia Boud. 1885,
Cheilymenia coprinaria (Cooke) Boud. 1907
Cheilymenia pulcherrima (P. Crouan & H. Crouan) Boud. 1907

Genus: Chiodecton Ach. 1814
Chiodecton capense (A. Massal.) Zahlbr. 1923, accepted as Chiodecton colensoi (A. Massal.) Müll. Arg., (1894)
Chiodecton direnium Nyl.*
Chiodecton galactinum Zahlbr. 1932
Chiodecton natalense Nyl. 1869
Chiodecton sanguineum f. roseocinctum (Fr.) Vain. 1890, [as f. rosaceocinctum], accepted as Herpothallon roseocinctum (Fr.) Aptroot, Lücking & G. Thor, (2009)
Chiodecton subnanum Vain. 1930
Chiodecton vanderbylii Zahlbr. 1932
Chiodecton venosum (Pers.) Zahlbr. 1905, accepted as Enterographa crassa (DC.) Fée, (1825) 

Family: Chiodectonaceae Zahlbr. 1905

Genus: Chlamydopus Speg. 1898,
Chlamydopus meyenianus (Klotzsch) Lloyd 1903,

Genus: Chloridium Link 1809, accepted as Chaetosphaeria Tul. & C. Tul.,(1863)
Chloridium meliolae Hansf. 1946, accepted as Ramichloridium meliolae (Hansf.) de Hoog, (1977)

Genus: Chlorociboria Seaver 1936, 
Chlorociboria aeruginosa (Oeder) Seaver (1958)

Genus: Chlorodothis Clem. 1909, accepted as Tomasellia A. Massal., (1856)
Chlorodothis lahmii (Müll. Arg.) Clem. 1909

Genus: Chlorosplenium Fr. 1849 
Chlorosplenium aeruginosum (Oeder) De Not. 1863, accepted as Chlorociboria aeruginosa (Oeder) Seaver, (1936)

Family: Choanephoraceae J. Schröt. 1897

Genus: Chondrioderma Rostaf. 1873, accepted as Diderma Pers., (1794) Protozoa
Chondrioderma difforme (Pers.) Rostaf. 1873, accepted as Didymium difforme (Pers.) Gray, (1821)
Chondrioderma subdictyospermumRostaf. 1876 as subdictyosperum; Protozoa

Genus: Chondromyces Berk. & M.A. Curtis 1874
Chondromyces aurantiacus Thaxter.*

Genus: Chroolepus C. Agardh 1824, accepted as Cystocoleus Thwaites, (1849)
Chroolepus afrum Massal. (sic) possibly Müll. Arg. 1861

Genus: Chrysomyces Theiss. & Syd. 1917, accepted as Perisporiopsis Henn., (1904)
Chrysomyces brachystegiae (Henn.) Theiss. & Syd. 1917, [as brachtystegiae], accepted as Perisporiopsis brachystegiae (Henn.) Arx, (1962)

Family: Chrysothricaceae*

Order Chytridiales Cohn 1879

Ci

Genus: Cicinnobella Henn. 1904, accepted as Perisporiopsis Henn., (1904)
Cicinnobella sp.

Genus: Cicinnobolus Ehrenb. 1853, accepted as Ampelomyces Ces. ex Schltdl., (1852)
Cicinnobolus cesatii de Bary, 1870, accepted as Ampelomyces quisqualis Ces., 1852[

Genus: Cienkowskia Rostaf. 1873, accepted as Willkommlangea Kuntze, (1891)
Cienkowskia reticulata (Alb. & Schwein.) Rostaf. 1875, accepted as Willkommlangea reticulata (Alb. & Schwein.) Kuntze, (1891)

Genus: Ciliciopodium Corda 1831
Ciliciopodium caespitosum  (Welw. & Curr.) Sacc. 1886

Genus: Cintractia Cornu 1883
Cintractia axicola (Berk.) Cornu 1883
Cintractia capensis (Reess) Cif. 1931, accepted as Bauerago capensis (Reess) Vánky, (1999)
Cintractia caricicola Henn. 1895
Cintractia crus-galli (Tracy & Earle) Magnus 1896, accepted as Ustilago crus-galli Tracy & Earle, (1895)
Cintractia leucoderma (Berk.) Henn. 1895, accepted as Leucocintractia leucoderma (Berk.) M. Piepenbr.,  (2000)
Cintractia melinidis Zundel [as melinis], (1938)
Cintractia piluliformis (Berk.) Henn. 1898, accepted as Heterotolyposporium piluliforme (Berk.) Vánky, (1997)
Cintractia sorghi-vulgaris (Tul. & C.Tul.) G.P.Clinton (1897), accepted as  Sporisorium sorghi Ehrenb. ex Link (1825)
Cintractia togoensis Henn. 1905, accepted as Cintractia limitata G.P. Clinton, (1904)

Genus: Circinella Tiegh. & G. Le Monn. 1873
Circinella sydowii Lendn. 1913, accepted as Circinella muscae (Sorokīn) Berl. & De Toni, (1888)

Cl
Genus: Cladia Nyl. 1870,
Cladia aggregata (Sw.) Nyl. 1870

Family: Cladochytriaceae J. Schröt. 1897

Genus: Cladoderris Pers. ex Berk. 1842, accepted as Cymatoderma Jungh., (1840)
Cladoderris australica Berk. 1888, accepted as Cymatoderma elegans Jungh., (1840)
Cladoderris elegans (Jungh.) Fr., (1849) accepted as Cymatoderma elegans Jungh. 1840
Cladoderris funalis Henn. 1905, accepted as Pterygellus funalis (Henn.) D.A. Reid, (1976)
Cladoderris infundibuliformis (Klotzsch) Fr. 1845, accepted as Cymatoderma infundibuliforme (Klotzsch) Boidin, (1959)
Cladoderris spongiosa Fr. 1845, accepted as Cymatoderma elegans Jungh., (1840)
Cladoderris spongiosa var. subsessilis Fr. 1849, accepted as Cymatoderma elegans Jungh., (1840)
Cladoderris thwaitesii Berk. & Broome 1873, accepted as Stereopsis radicans (Berk.) D.A. Reid, (1965)

Family: Cladoniaceae Zenker 1827,

Genus: Cladonia P. Browne 1756,
Cladonia aggregata Ach.(sic) possibly (Sw.) Spreng. 1827, accepted as Cladia aggregata (Sw.) Nyl., (167) (1870)
Cladonia bacillaris Nyl. (sic) possibly (Ach.) Genth 1835
Cladonia bacillaris f. pityropoda Nyl. ex Cromb. 1894, accepted as Cladonia macilenta Hoffm.,  [1795]
Cladonia caespiticia Floerke.(sic) possibly (Pers.) P. Gaertn., B. Mey & Scherb. 1802
Cladonia centrophora Müll. Arg. 1887
Cladonia chlorophaea (Flörke ex Sommerf.) Spreng. 1827
Cladonia chordalis Ach. (sic) possibly (Flörke) Nyl.
Cladonia didyma var. muscigena (Eschw.) Vain. 1887
Cladonia didyma var. muscigena f. subulata Sandst.*
Cladonia fimbriata (L.) Fr. 1831
Cladonia fimbriata f. abortiva  (Flörke) Harm. 1896
Cladonia fimbriata var. balfourii (Cromb.) Vain. 1894, accepted as Cladonia subradiata (Vain.) Sandst., (1922)
Cladonia fimbriata var. chlorophaeoides (Vain.) C.W. Dodge 1950;
Cladonia fimbriata var. chondroidea Vain. 1894
Cladonia fimbriata var. chondroidea f. balfourii*
Cladonia fimbriata var. chondroidea f. chlorophaeoides Wain.*
Cladonia fimbriata var. chondroidea f. subradiata Wain.*
Cladonia fimbriata var. coniocraea Wain. (sic) possibly (Flörke) Nyl. 1858, accepted as Cladonia coniocraea (Flörke) Spreng., (1827)
Cladonia fimbriata var. fibula Stizenb. (sic) possibly (Hoffm.) Nyl. 1861
Cladonia fimbriata var. nemoxyna (Ach.) Coem. ex Vain. 1894,  accepted as Cladonia rei Schaer., (1823)
Cladonia fimbriata var. nemoxyna f. fibula Wain.*
Cladonia fimbriata var. ochrochlora Wain. (sic) possibly (Flörke) Schaer. 1833, accepted as Cladonia ochrochlora Flörke, (1827)
Cladonia fimbriata var. radiata Coem. (sic) possibly (Schreb.) Cromb. 1831, accepted as Cladonia subulata (L.) Weber ex F.H. Wigg., (1780)
Cladonia fimbriata var. radiata f. nemoxyna Flotow.*
Cladonia fimbriata var. simplex (Weiss) Flot. ex Vain. 1894
Cladonia fimbriata var. subcornuta Nyl. ex Arnold 1875, accepted as Cladonia subulata (L.) Weber ex F.H. Wigg., (1780)
Cladonia fimbriata var. subradiata Vain. 1894,
Cladonia fimbriata var. subulata (L.) Vain. 1894, accepted as Cladonia subulata (L.) Weber ex F.H. Wigg., (1780)
Cladonia fimbriata var. subulata f. abortiva Harm.*
Cladonia fimbriata var. subulata f. chordalis Ach.*
Cladonia fimbriata var. subulata f. subcornuta Zahlbr.*
Cladonia fimbriata var. tubaeformis Ach. (sic) possibly (Hoffm.) Fr. 1831
Cladonia flabelliformis f. tenella (Müll. Arg.) Zahlbr. 1926
Cladonia fiabelliformis var. tenella  Müll. Arg. 1891
Cladonia floerkeana Sommerf. (sic) possibly (Fr.) Flörke 1828
Cladonia furcata Sehrad. (sic) possibly (Huds.) Baumg. 1790
Cladonia gorgonina var. subrangiferina (Nyl.) Vain. 1887, accepted as Cladia aggregata (Sw.) Nyl., (1870)
Cladonia macilenta Hoffm. 1796
Cladonia macilenta var. corticata (Vain.) Doidge 1950
Cladonia multiformis Merrill f. subascypha Evans.*
Cladonia neglecta (Flörke) Spreng. 1827, accepted as Cladonia pyxidata (L.) Hoffm., (1796) [1795]
Cladonia ochrochlora Flörke 1827
Cladonia pityrea (Flörke) Fr. 1826, accepted as Cladonia ramulosa (With.) J.R. Laundon, (1984)
Cladonia pityrea f. scyphifera (Delise) Vain. 1894, accepted as Cladonia ramulosa (With.) J.R. Laundon, (1984)
Cladonia pityrea var. subareolata Vain. 1894
Cladonia pityrea var. zwackii Vain. 1894 f. scyphifera Vain.*
Cladonia pungens Floerke (sic) possibly (Ach.) Gray 1821, accepted as Cladonia pertricosa Kremp., (1881) [1880]
Cladonia pungens f. foliolosa Nyi. (sic) possibly (Flörke) Leight. 1879
Cladonia pycnoclada (Pers.) Nyl. 1867,
Cladonia pycnoclada f. exalbescens (Vain.) Petr. 1948, accepted as Cladonia confusa R. Sant., (1942)
Cladonia pyxidata Fr. (sic) possibly (L.) Hoffm. 1796
Cladonia pyxidata f. staphylea Nyl. (sic) possibly (Ach.) Harm. 1896
Cladonia pyxidata var. chlorophaea (Flörke ex Sommerf.) Flörke 1894, accepted as Cladonia chlorophaea (Flörke ex Sommerf.) Spreng.,  (1827)
Cladonia pyxidate var. chlorophaea f. staphylea Harm.*
Cladonia pyxidata var. pocillum (Ach.) Flot. ex Vain. 1894, accepted as Cladonia pocillum (Ach.) O.J. Rich., (1877)
Cladonia rangiferina (L.) Weber 1780,
Cladonia rangiformis var. foliosa Flörke ex Vain. 1887
Cladonia rangiformis var. pungens (Ach.) Vain. 1887, accepted as Cladonia pertricosa Kremp.,  (1881) [1880]
Cladonia squamosa Hoffm. 1796
Cladonia subcornuta Stizenb. (sic) possibly (Nyl. ex Arnold) Cromb. 1880, accepted as Cladonia subulata (L.) Weber ex F.H. Wigg., (1780)
Cladonia sylvatica (L.) Hoffm. 1796, accepted as Cladonia portentosa (Dufour) Coem., (1865)
Cladonia verticillata (Hoffm.) Ach. 1799,  accepted as Cladonia cervicornis (Ach.) Flot.,  (1849)
Cladonia sp.

Genus: Cladosporium Link 1816
Cladosporium aphidis Thüm. 1877
Cladosporium asteromatoides Sacc. 1885
Cladosporium baccae Verwoerd & Dippen. 1930
Cladosporium berkheyae Syd. & P. Syd. 1914, accepted as Passalora berkheyae (Syd. & P. Syd.) U. Braun & Crous, (2003)
Cladosporium carpophilum  Thüm. (1877), accepted as Venturia carpophila E.E.Fisher (1961)
Cladosporium citri possibly Massee 1899
Cladosporium cucumerinum Ellis & Arthur 1889
Cladosporium elatum (Harz) Nannf. 1934
Cladosporium fulvum Cooke 1883 accepted as Fulvia fulva (Cooke) Cif., (1954)
Cladosporium herbarum (Pers.) Link 1816
Cladosporium laxum Kalchbr. & Cooke 1880, accepted as Passalora laxa (Kalchbr. & Cooke) U. Braun & Crous, (2003)
Cladosporium macrocarpum Preuss 1848
Cladosporium melanophloei Thüm. 1877
Cladosporium pisicola W.C. Snyder [as pisicolum], (1934)
Cladosporium tenuissimum Cooke 1878
Cladosporium vignae Rac. (sic) possibly M.W. Gardner 1925,
Cladosporium zeae Peck 1894
Cladosporium sp.

Genus: Clasterosporium Schwein. 1832 
Clasterosporium carpophilum  (Lév.) Aderh. (1901), accepted as Stigmina carpophila (Lév.) M.B. Ellis, (1959)
Clasterosporium celastri (Thüm.) Sacc. 1886
Clasterosporium clavatum (Lév.) Sacc. 1886
Clasterosporium densum  Syd. & P. Syd. 1912 accepted as Annellophorella densa (Syd. & P. Syd.) Subram., (1962)

Family: Clathraceae Chevall. 1826

Genus: Clathroporina Müll. Arg. 1882
Clathroporina locuples (Stizenb.) Zahlbr. 1922

Genus: Clathrus P. Micheli ex L. 1753, (formerly Clathrella)
Clathrus angolensis (Welw. & Curr.) E. Fisch. 1886, accepted as Blumenavia angolensis (Welw. & Curr.) Dring, (1980)
Clathrus baumii Henn. 1903
Clathrus camerunensis Henn. 1890
Clathrus cancellatus Tourn. ex Fr. 1823, accepted as Clathrus ruber P. Micheli ex Pers., (1801)
Clathrus cibarius (Tul. & C. Tul.) E. Fisch. 1886, accepted as Ileodictyon cibarium Tul. & C. Tul. [as 'cibaricum'], (1844)
Clathrus gracilis (Berk.) Schltdl. 1862, accepted as Ileodictyon gracile Berk., (1845)
Clathrus pseudocancellatus (E. Fisch.) Lloyd 1909, [as pseudocancellata]
Clathrus sp.

Genus: Claudopus Gillet 1876, accepted as Entoloma (Fr.) P. Kumm., (1871)
Claudopus proteus Kalchbr. (sic) possibly Sacc. 1887, accepted as Melanotus proteus (Sacc.) Singer, (1946)
Claudopus variabilis (Pers.) Gillet 1876, accepted as Crepidotus variabilis (Pers.) P. Kumm., (1871)

Family: Clavariaceae Chevall. 1826

Genus: Clavaria P. Micheli 1729
Clavaria abietina Pers. 1794, accepted as Phaeoclavulina abietina (Pers.) Giachini, (2011)
Clavaria byssiseda Pers. 1796 
Clavaria capensis Thunb. 1800
Clavaria cinerea Bull. 1788, accepted as Clavulina cinerea (Bull.) J. Schröt., (1888)
Clavaria cladoniae Kalchbr. 1882, accepted as Ramaria cladoniae (Kalchbr.) D.A. Reid, (1974)
Clavaria contorta Holmsk. 1790, accepted as Typhula contorta (Holmsk.) Olariaga, (2013)
Clavaria corniculata Schaeff. 1774,  accepted as Clavulinopsis corniculata (Schaeff.) Corner, (1950)
Clavaria corniculata var. pratensis (Pers.) Cotton & Wakefield 1919, accepted as Clavulinopsis corniculata (Schaeff.) Corner, (1950)
Clavaria cristata (Holmsk.) Pers. 1801, accepted as Clavulina coralloides (L.) J. Schröt., (1888)
Clavaria cyanocephala Berk. & M.A. Curtis 1868, accepted as Phaeoclavulina cyanocephala (Berk. & M.A. Curtis) Giachini, (2011)
Clavaria dealbata Berk. 1856, accepted as Ramariopsis dealbata (Berk.) R.H. Petersen, (1984)
Clavaria dichotoma Kalchbr. 1882, accepted as Ramaria saccardoi (P. Syd.) Corner, (1950)
Clavaria durbana Van der Byl 1932, accepted as Scytinopogon pallescens (Bres.) Singer, (1945)
Clavaria fastigiata L. 1753, accepted as Clavulinopsis corniculata (Schaeff.) Corner, (1950)
Clavaria flaccida Fr. 1821, accepted as Phaeoclavulina flaccida (Fr.) Giachini, (2011)
Clavaria furcellata Fr. 1830
Clavaria inaequalis O.F. Müll. 1780
Clavaria kalchbrenneri Sacc. 1888
Clavaria kunzei Fr. (1821), accepted as Ramariopsis kunzei (Fr.) Corner (1950)
Clavaria laeticolor Berk. & M.A. Curtis 1868, accepted as Clavulinopsis laeticolor (Berk. & M.A. Curtis) R.H. Petersen, (1965)
Clavaria ligula Schaeff. 1774, accepted as Clavariadelphus ligula (Schaeff.) Donk, (1933)
Clavaria lorithamnus Berk. 1872, accepted as Ramaria lorithamnus (Berk.) R.H. Petersen, 
Clavaria miniata Berk. (1843), accepted as Clavulinopsis sulcata Overeem (1923)
Clavaria muscoides L. 1753
Clavaria persimilis Cotton 1910, accepted as Clavulinopsis laeticolor (Berk. & M.A. Curtis) R.H. Petersen, (1965)
Clavaria pistillaris L. 1753, accepted as Clavariadelphus pistillaris (L.) Donk, (1933)
Clavaria pulchra Peck 1876, accepted as Clavulinopsis laeticolor (Berk. & M.A. Curtis) R.H. Petersen, (1965)
Clavaria semivestita Berk. & Broome 1873, accepted as Clavulinopsis semivestita (Berk. & Broome) Corner, (1950)
Clavaria setacea Kalchbr. 1882,  accepted as Pterula setacea (Kalchbr.) Corner, (1950)
Clavaria stricta Pers. 1795,  accepted as Ramaria stricta (Pers.) Quél., (1888)
Clavaria vermicularis Fr. (sic), possibly Sw. (1811), accepted as Clavaria fragilis Holmsk. (1790)
Clavaria zippelii Lév. 1844,  accepted as Phaeoclavulina zippelii (Lév.) Overeem, (1923)

Genus: Claviceps Tul. 1853
Claviceps digitariae Hansf. 1941
Claviceps microcephala (Wallr.) Tul. 1853, accepted as Claviceps purpurea (Fr.) Tul., (1853)
Claviceps paspali F. Stevens & J.G. Hall 1910
Claviceps purpurea (Fr.) Tul. 1853
Claviceps sp.

Genus: Clitocybe (Fr.) Staude 1857, 
Clitocybe amara Quel. (sic) (Alb. & Schwein.) P. Kumm. 1871, accepted as Lepista amara (Alb. & Schwein.) Maire, (1930)
Clitocybe expallens Quel.(sic) (Pers.) P. Kumm. 1871, accepted as Pseudoclitocybe expallens (Pers.) M.M. Moser, (1967) 
Clitocybe fragrans Quel. (sic) (With.) P. Kumm. 1871
Clitocybe gentianea Quél. 1873,  accepted as Leucopaxillus gentianeus (Quél.) Kotl. (1966)
Clitocybe infundibuliformis var. membranacea Gill. (sic) (Vahl) Massee 1893, accepted as Infundibulicybe gibba (Pers.) Harmaja, (2003)
Clitocybe membranacea Fr. (sic) (Vahl) Sacc. 1887, accepted as Infundibulicybe gibba (Pers.) Harmaja, (2003)
Clitocybe sinopica Gill. (sic) (Fr.) P. Kumm. 1871, accepted as Bonomyces sinopicus (Fr.) Vizzini, (2014)
Clitocybe splendens (Pers.) Gillet 1874, accepted as Paralepista splendens (Pers.) Vizzini, (2012)
Clitocybe trulliformis (Fr.) P. Karst. [as trullaeformis] accepted as Infundibulicybe trulliformis (Fr.) Gminder 2016
Clitocybe ziziphina (Viv.) Sacc. (1887), [as zizyphina].

Genus: Clitopilus (Fr. ex Rabenh.) P. Kumm. 1871
Clitopilus prunulus Quel. (sic) (Scop.) P. Kumm. 1871

Genus: Clypeolella Höhn. 1910, accepted as Sarcinella Sacc. (1880)
Clypeolella psychotriae (Doidge) Doidge 1942, accepted as Schiffnerula psychotriae (Doidge) S. Hughes, (1987)
Clypeolella rhamnicola (Doidge) Doidge 1942, accepted as Schiffnerula rhamnicola (Doidge) S. Hughes, (1987)

Genus: Clypeosphaeria Fuckel 1870
Clypeosphaeria natalensis Doidge 1922,

Co

Genus: Cochliobolus Drechsler 1934, accepted as Bipolaris Shoemaker, (1959)
Cochliobolus stenospilus  T. Matsumoto & W. Yamam. 1936, [as Cochliobilus stenospilus] accepted as Bipolaris stenospila (Drechsler ex Faris) Shoemaker, (2018)

Family: Coccidioidaceae Cif. 1932

Genus: Coccocarpia Pers. 1827
Coccocarpia pellita var. parmelioides (Hook.) Müll. Arg. 1887, accepted as Coccocarpia erythroxyli (Spreng.) Swinscow & Krog (1976)

Genus: Coccochora Höhn. 1909,
Coccochora lebeckiae Verwoerd & Dippen. 1930, accepted as Coleroa lebeckiae (Verwoerd & Dippen.) Arx, (1962)

Genus: Cocconia Sacc. 1889
Cocconia capensis Doidge 1921, accepted as Cycloschizon capense (Doidge) Arx, (1962)
Cocconia concentrica (Syd. & P. Syd.) Syd. 1915
Cocconia porrigo (Cooke) Sacc. 1889, accepted as Cycloschizon porrigo (Cooke) Arx, (1962)

Family: Coenogoniaceae Stizenb. 1862

temp
Genus: Coenogonium 
Coenogonium afrum  Massal.
Coenogonium interplexum Nyl.

Genus: Coleophoma 
Coleophoma Oleae Petr. & Syd.

Genus: Coleosporium 
Coleosporium clematidis Bare.
Coleosporium detergibile Thuem.
Coleosporium hedyotidis Kalchbr. & Cooke
Coleosporium ipomoeae Burr.
Coleosporium ochraceum Bon.

Family: Collemaceae 

Genus: Collema 
Collema aggregatum Rohl.
Collema bullatum Ach.
Collema byrsinum Ach.
Collema caespitosum Tayl.
Collema crispum Wigg.
Collema fuliginellum Nyl.
Collema furvum DC.
Collema lanatum Pers.
Collema nigrescens DC.
Collema pulposum Ach. var. tenax Nyl.
Collema redundans Nyl.
Collema satuminum DC.
Collema tenax Ach.
Collema thysaneum Ach.
Collema tremelloides Ach.

Genus: Colletotrichum 
Colletotrichum agaves Cav.
Colletotrichum anonicola Speg.
Colletotrichum antirrhini Stew.
Colletotrichum atramentarium Taubenh.
Colletotrichum brachytrichum Del.
Colletotrichum cameiliae Mass.
Colletotrichum carica Stev. & Hall.
Colletotrichum cereale Manns.
Colletotrichum circinans Vogl.
Colletotrichum coffeanum Noack.
Colletotrichum dematium Grove.
Colletotrichum falcatum Went.
Colletotrichum gloeosporioides Penz.
Colletotrichum glycines Hori.
Colletotrichum gossypii Edgert.
Colletotrichum graminicolum Wilson.
Colletotrichum kickxiae Verw. & du Pless.
Colletotrichum lagenarium Ell. & Halst.
Colletotrichum lindemuthianum Shear
Colletotrichum malvarum Braun & Casp.
Colletotrichum nigrum Ell. & Halst.
Colletotrichum omnivorum Halst.
Colletotrichum orchidearum Allesch.
Colletotrichum papayae Syd.
Colletotrichum phomoides Chester.
Colletotrichum pterocelastri Wakef.
Colletotrichum rhodocyclum Petrak.
Colletotrichum trifolii Bain & Essary.
Colletotrichum sp.

Genus: Colonnaria 
Colonnaria columnata Ed.Fisch.

Genus: Collybia 
Collybia acervata Gill.
Collybia albuminosa Petch.
Collybia alveolata Sacc.
Collybia butyracea Quel.
Collybia chortophila Sacc.
Collybia confluens Quel.
Collybia dryophila Quel.
Collybia dryophila var. oedipus Quel.
Collybia extuberans Quel.
Collybia fusipes Quel. var. contorta Gill. & Lucand.
Collybia homotricha Sacc.
Collybia macilenta Gill.
Collybia melinosarca Sacc.
Collybia radicata Quel.
Collybia radicata var. brachypus Sacc.
Collybia ratticauda Fayod.
Collybia stipulincola Kalchbr.
Collybia stridula Quel.
Collybia velutipes Quel.
Collybia sp.

Genus: Comatricha 
Comatricha irregularis Peck.
Comatricha longa Peck.
Comatricha nigra Schroet.
Comatricha nigra var. alta Lister.
Comatricha tenerrima G. Lister.
Comatricha typhoides Rost.

Genus: Combea 
Combea mollusca Ach.
Combea pruinosa de Not.

Genus: Coniocybe 
Coniocybe owanii Korb.

Genus: Coniodictyum 
Coniodictyum evansii v.Hohn

Genus: Coniophora 
Coniophora atrocinerea Karst.
Coniophora betulae Karst.
Coniophora cerebella Pers.
Coniophora papillosa Talbot.
Coniophora pulverulenta Mass.
Coniophora puteana Karst.
Coniophora olivacea Karst.

Genus: Coniothorium 
Coniosporium schiraianum Bubak.

Genus: Coniothecium 
Coniothecium chomatosporum Corda.
Coniothecium citri McAlp.
Coniothecium macowanii Sace.
Coniothecium punctiforme Wint.
Coniothecium scabrum McAlp.
Coniothecium sp.

Genus: Coniothyrina 
Coniothyrina agaves Petrak & Syd.

Genus: Coniothyrium 
Coniothyrium fuckelii Sacc.
Coniothyrium insigne Syd.
Coniothyrium occultum Syd.
Coniothyrium palmicolum Starb.
Coniothyrium rafniicola Petrak.

Genus: Conotrema 
Conotrema volvarioides Müll.Arg.

Genus: Cookeina 
Cookeina colensoi Seaver

Genus: Coprinus 
Coprinus atramentarius Fr. (= Coprinopsis atramentaria)
Coprinus cheesmani Th.Gibbs
Coprinus cinereus S.F.Gray (= Coprinopsis cinerea)
Coprinus comatus S.F.Gray
Coprinus comatus var. ovatus Quel.
Coprinus curtus Kalchbr.
Coprinus digitalis Fr.
Coprinus ephemerus Fr.
Coprinus flocculosus Fr.
Coprinus macrorhizus Rea.
Coprinus micaceus Fr. (= Coprinellus micaceus)
Coprinus micaceus var. truncorum Quel.
Coprinus niveus Fr. Schaeff. ex Fr. (= Coprinellus niveus)
Coprinus plicatilis Fr.
Coprinus punctatus Kalchbr. & Cooke
Coprinus radiatus S.F.Gray (= Coprinopsis radiata)
Coprinus stercorarius Fr.
Coprinus truncorum Fr.
Coprinus sp.

Genus: Cordana 
Cordana musae v.Hohn.
Cordana pauciseptata Preuss.
Cordana sp.

Genus: Cordyceps 
Cordyceps flabella Berk. & Curt.
Cordyceps velutipes Mass.
Cordyceps sp.

Genus: Cornicularia 
Cornicularia tenuissima Zahlbr.

Genus: Corollospora 
Corollospora maritima Werd.

Genus: Corticium 
Corticium abeuns Burt.
Corticium argillaceum v.Hohn. & Litsch
Corticium armeniacum Sacc. (= Cerocorticium molle)
Corticium atrocinereum Kalchbr.
Corticium bombycinum Bres.
Corticium caeruleum Fr.
Corticium calceum Fr. emend. Romell & Burt
Corticium calceum Fr.
Corticium calceum var. lacteum Fr.
Corticium ceraceum Berk. & Rav. (= Cerocorticium molle)
Corticium cinereum Fr. (= Peniophora cinerea)
Corticium confluens Fr.
Corticium dregeanum Berk.
Corticium gloeosporum Talbot
Corticium lacteum Fr. (= Phanerochaete tuberculata)
Corticium laetum Bres.
Corticium luteocystidiatum Talbot
Corticium nudum Fr.
Corticium pelliculare Karst.
Corticium portentosum Berk. & Curt.
Corticium pulverulentum Cooke
Corticium salmonicolor Berk. & Br. (= Phanerochaete salmonicolor)
Corticium scutellare Berk. & Curt.
Corticium solani Bourd. & Galz
Corticium tumulosum Talbot
Corticium vagum Berk. & Curt.
Corticium vagum var. solani Burt.
Corticium sp.

Genus: Cortinarius 
Cortinarius argutus Fr.
Cortinarius camurus Fr.
Cortinarius castaneus Fr.
Cortinarius fusco-tinctus Rea.
Cortinarius lepidopus Cooke.
Cortinarius multiformis Fr.

Family: Coryneliaceae

Genus: Corynelia 
Corynelia carpophila Syd.
Corynelia clavata Sacc.
Corynelia clavata f. fructicola Rehm.
Corynelia fructicola v.Hohn.
Corynelia tripos Cooke
Corynelia uberata Fr. ex Ach.

Genus: Coryneliospora 
Coryneliospora fructicola Fitz.

Genus: Coryneum 
Coryneum beyerinckii Oud. (Stigmina carpophila) 
Coryneum cocoes P.Henn.
Coryneum disciforme Kunze & Schum.
Coryneum dovyalidis v.d.Byl.
Coryneum kunzei Corda.

Cr
Genus: Craterellus 
Craterellus comucopioides Pers.

Genus: Craterium 
Craterium aureum Rost.
Craterium eonfusum Mass.
Craterium leucocephalum Ditm. var. scyphoides Lister.
Craterium minutum Fr.

Genus: Crepidotus 
Crepidotus applanatus Karst.
Crepidotus episphaeria Sacc.
Crepidotus inandae Sacc.
Crepidotus mollis Quel.
Crepidotus pogonatus Sacc.
Crepidotus scalaris Karst, var. lobulatus Sacc.

Genus: Cribraria 
Cribraria argillacea Pers.
Cribraria intricata Schrad.
Cribraria tenella Schrad.

Genus: Crocynia 
Crocynia membranacea Zahlbr.

Genus: Cronartium 
Cronartium bresadoleanum P.Henn.
Cronartium bresadoleanum var. eucleae P.Henn.
Cronartium gilgianum P.Henn.
Cronartium zizyphi Syd. & Butl.

Genus: Crossopsora 
Crossopsora gilgiana Syd.

Genus: Crucibulum 
Crucibulum vulgare Tul.

Genus: Cryptococcus 
Cryptococcus histolycus Stoddard & Cutler.
Cryptococcus linguae-pilosa Castellani & Chalmers.
Cryptococcus sp.

Genus: Cryptodidymosphaeria 
Cryptodidymosphaeria clandestina Syd.

Genus: Cryptogene 
Cryptogene parodiellae Syd.

Genus: Cryptogenella 
Cryptogenella parodiellae Syd.

Genus: Cryptomyces 
Cryptomyces eugeniacearum Sacc.
Cryptomyces melianthi Sacc.
Cryptomyces myricae Sacc.

Genus: Cryptosporella 
Cryptosporella umbrina Wehm.

Genus: Cryptosporium 
Cryptosporium fatale Kalchbr.

Genus: Cryptostictus 
Cryptostictis dryopteris Verw. & du Pless.

Genus: Cryptothecia 
Cryptothecia subnidulans Stirt.

Family: Cryptotheciaceae

Cu
Genus: Cunninghamiella 
Cunninghamella sp.

Genus: Curvularia 
Curvularia intermedia Boedijn.
Curvularia lunata Boedijn. (= Cochliobolus lunatus)
Curvularia maculans Boedijn.
Curvularia spicifera Boedijn. (= Cochliobolus spicifer)
Curvularia sp.

Cy
Genus: Cyanisticta 
Cyanisticta crocata Gyeln.
Cyanisticta crocata var. isidiata Gyeln.
Cyanisticta gilva Gyeln.
Cyanisticta gilva var. angustilobata Gyeln.
Cyanisticta gilva var. lanata Gyeln.
Cyanisticta gilva var. pseudogilva Gyeln.
Cyanisticta subcrocata Gyeln.
Cyanisticta thouarsii Gyeln.

Genus: Cyathus 
Cyathus berkeleyanus Lloyd
Cyathus dasypus Nees
Cyathus hookeri Berk.
Cyathus laevis Thunb.
Cyathus microsporus Tul.
Cyathus minutosporus Lloyd
Cyathus montagnei Tul.
Cyathus olla Pers.
Cyathus pallidus Berk. & Curt.
Cyathus plicatulus Poepp.
Cyathus poeppigii Tul.
Cyathus rufipes Ellis.
Cyathus stercoreus de Toni.
Cyathus stercoreus f. leseurii Tul.
Cyathus sulcatus Kalchbr.
Cyathus verrucosus DC.

Genus: Cyeloconium 
Cyeloconuim oleaginum Cast.

Genus: Cycloschizon 
Cycloschizon brachylaenae P.Henn.
Cycloschizon fimbriatum Doidge

Genus: Cyclotheca 
Cyclotheca bosciae Doidge

Genus: Cylindrocarpon 
Cylindrocarpon album Wollenw. var. crassum Wollenw.

Genus: Cylindrocladium 
Cylindrocladium scoparium Morgan

Genus: Cylindrosporium 
Cylindrosporium castanicolum Berl.
Cylindrosporium chrysanthemi Ell. & Dearn.
Cylindrosporium juglandis Wolf
Cylindrosporium kilimandscharicum Allesch.
Cylindrosporium padi Karst.
Cylindrosporium ribis Davis.

Genus: Cymatoderma 
Cymatoderma elegans Jungh.

Family: Cyphellaceae

Genus: Cyphella 
Cyphella alboviolascens Karst.
Cyphella cheesmanni Mass.
Cyphella farinacea Kalchbr. & Cooke
Cyphella friesii Crouan.
Cyphella fulvodisca Cooke & Mass.
Cyphella pelargonii Kalchbr.
Cyphella punetiformis Karst.
Cyphella tabacina Cooke & Phil.
Cyphella variolosa Kalchbr.

Genus: Cystingophora 
Cystingophora deformans Syd.

Genus: Cystopus 
Cystopus amaranthi Berk.
Cystopus austro-africanus Sacc. & Trott.
Cystopus austro-africanus Wakef.
Cystopus bliti de Bary.
Cystopus candidus de Bary.
Cystopus cubicus de Bary.
Cystopus evansii Sacc. & Trott.
Cystopus evansii Wakef.
Cystopus impomoeae-panduranae  Stev. & Swing.
Cystopus portulacae de Bary.
Cystopus quadratus Kalchbr. & Cooke
Cystopus schlechteri Syd.
Cystopus tragopogonis Schroet.

Genus: Cystotelium 
Cystotelium inornatum Syd.

Genus: Cytidea 
Cytidea cornea Lloyd
Cytidea flocculenta v.Hohn  & Litsch
Cytidea habgallae Martin
Cytidea simulans Lloyd

Genus: Cytoplea 
Cytoplea adeniae du Pless.

Genus: Cytospora 
Cytospora australiae Speg.
Cytospora chrysosperma Fr.
Cytospora foliicola Libert
Cytospora leucostoma Sacc.
Cytospora sacchari Butl.
Cytospora verrucula Saco. & Berl.
Cytospora xanthosperma Fr.

Genus: Cytosporella 
Cytosporella aloes du Pless.

References

Sources

See also

 List of fungi of South Africa
 List of fungi of South Africa – A
 List of fungi of South Africa – B

 List of fungi of South Africa – D
 List of fungi of South Africa – E
 List of fungi of South Africa – F
 List of fungi of South Africa – G
 List of fungi of South Africa – H
 List of fungi of South Africa – I
 List of fungi of South Africa – J
 List of fungi of South Africa – K
 List of fungi of South Africa – L
 List of fungi of South Africa – M
 List of fungi of South Africa – N
 List of fungi of South Africa – O
 List of fungi of South Africa – P
 List of fungi of South Africa – Q
 List of fungi of South Africa – R
 List of fungi of South Africa – S
 List of fungi of South Africa – T
 List of fungi of South Africa – U
 List of fungi of South Africa – V
 List of fungi of South Africa – W
 List of fungi of South Africa – X
 List of fungi of South Africa – Y
 List of fungi of South Africa – Z

Further reading
 

Fungi
Fungi C
South Africa